South Lake Trail is a multi-use trail in Lake County, Florida. It a 4-mile trail connecting the Lake Minneola Scenic Trail to the 22-mile West Orange Trail. The trails form part of a planned Central Florida Loop. South Lake Trail is the largest in Lake County. The trail is hilly in parts.

See also
Coast-to-Coast Connector trail

References

External links
 South Lake Trail at BikeOrlando.net
 South Lake Trail at TrailLink

Hiking trails in Florida
Protected areas of Lake County, Florida
Transportation in Lake County, Florida